Laurie Denommée (born 16 August 2000) is a Canadian artistic gymnast. A national team member since 2017, she represented Canada at the 2022 Commonwealth Games and the 2022 World Artistic Gymnastics Championships where she contributed to two team bronze medal finishes, the latter being a historic feat for Canada. Individually, she is the 2022 Commonwealth vault silver medallist.

Personal life
She is a student at the University of Montreal.

References 

2000 births
Living people
Canadian female artistic gymnasts
People from Saint-Eustache, Quebec
Sportspeople from Quebec
Medalists at the World Artistic Gymnastics Championships
Université de Montréal alumni
21st-century Canadian women
Commonwealth Games silver medallists for Canada
Commonwealth Games bronze medallists for Canada
Commonwealth Games medallists in gymnastics
Gymnasts at the 2022 Commonwealth Games
Medallists at the 2022 Commonwealth Games